Henry Robert Beech Mole (born 6 December 1988) is a British architect, artist, and designer.

Education and Career
Beech Mole was educated at the Royal College of Art and the Architectural Association in London. Beech Mole is the director of architecture studio BoBo in the Montmartre district of Paris.

Teaching and Activism 
Beech Mole is a co-founder of the Paris School of Architecture in the 19th arrondissement of Paris. Beech Mole conceived of an architecture competition in the town of Sidmouth in Devon, to challenge a scheme to develop luxury apartments and a hotel.

Exhibitions 
 Romani Techtonic, 2011 - RIBA, London.
 Twitter Tissues, DataSpace, 2014 - Victoria and Albert Museum, London.
 FINSK, The Finnish Institute in London and the Residence of the Ambassador of Finland, London, 2015.
 Monumentimals, Sir John Soane Museum, London, 2015. Monumentimals is held in the permanent collection of the museum alongside over 40,000 architectural and archaeological objects.
 Gothic Superegos, Museum of Architecture and Design, Ljubljana, 2016.
 Aphrodite's Fun Palace, "Nostos" at The Old Powerhouse, Paphos, 2017.

References 

1988 births
Living people
21st-century British artists